Catharina Johanna "Toos" Beumer (born 5 July 1947 in Koog aan de Zaan) is a Dutch swimmer. She won the bronze medal in the 4×100 metres freestyle relay at the 1964 Summer Olympics in Tokyo. Her teammates in that race, clocked in 4:12.0, were Pauline van der Wildt, Erica Terpstra and Winnie van Weerdenburg. Four years later, Beumer also participated in the 1968 Summer Olympics in Mexico City, in the 100 m freestyle, but she didn't qualify for the semi-finals.

References

1947 births
Living people
Dutch female freestyle swimmers
Medalists at the 1964 Summer Olympics
Olympic bronze medalists for the Netherlands
Olympic bronze medalists in swimming
Olympic swimmers of the Netherlands
Swimmers at the 1964 Summer Olympics
Swimmers at the 1968 Summer Olympics
European Aquatics Championships medalists in swimming
Sportspeople from Zaanstad
20th-century Dutch women
20th-century Dutch people
21st-century Dutch women